This is a list of diplomatic missions of Guatemala, excluding honorary consulates. It is also one of the more significant countries in the world which maintains an embassy in Taipei instead of Beijing.

Current missions

Africa

Americas

Asia

Europe

Oceania

Multilateral organizations

Gallery

Closed missions

Americas

Asia

Europe

See also
 Foreign relations of Guatemala
 Visa policy of Guatemala
 Visa requirements for Guatemalan citizens

Notes

References

External links

 Ministry of Foreign Affairs of Guatemala 

 
Guatemala
Diplomatic missions